Fahed Al-Mofarij is a retired footballer who last played for Al-Ettifaq in the Saudi Premier League. He was the director of football at Al-Hilal until May 23, 2019.

Al-Mofarij played for Al Hilal in the 2009 AFC Champions League group stages.

References

External links
Player profile at AlHilal.com 

1978 births
Living people
Saudi Arabian footballers
Al Hilal SFC players
Ettifaq FC players
Saudi Professional League players
Association football defenders